Georges Kamm (4 July 1894 – 4 February 1945) was a French racing cyclist. He rode in the 1921 Tour de France.

References

1894 births
1945 deaths
French male cyclists
Place of birth missing